Thomas Bush Hardy (1842, Sheffield – 1897, Maida Vale, London) was a British marine painter and watercolourist.

Biography
Hardy was born in Sheffield, Yorkshire on 3 May 1842. As a young man he travelled in the Netherlands and Italy.

In 1884 Hardy was elected a Member of the Royal Society of British Artists. He exhibited with the Society and also at the Royal Academy. His paintings feature coastal scenes in England and the Netherlands, the French Channel ports and the Venetian Lagoon.

He died on 15 December 1897 in Maida Vale, London and was buried on the eastern side of Highgate Cemetery. His grave has no headstone or marker.

Hardy had nine children. His son Dudley Hardy was a painter, illustrator and poster designer. His daughter Dorothy received an MBE after working as a nurse in the First World War.

Works
Schevening, the Netherlands (1873) is at Lamport Hall in Northamptonshire.
 Towing Boats out of Calais (1878) is held at Laing Art Gallery in Newcastle upon Tyne.
 Seascape (circa 1880) is held at Rotherham Museum and Galleries.
 Landscape (1882) is held at The National Library of Wales.
Museums Sheffield holds Seascape (1887). It also holds two paintings, each called Sea Piece. One is dated 1880 and the other is undated.
 Portsmouth Harbour (1891) is in the collection of the Art Gallery of New South Wales.
 Off the Dutch Coast (1896) is in the collection of Calderdale Metropolitan Borough Council.
A French Paddle Tug Bringing a Barque into Boulogne Harbour in Heavy Weather is in the National Maritime Museum.
View on the Grand Canal, Venice (1871),Calais (1886),Boulogne Harbour, and Fishing Boats at Sea are in the Victoria and Albert Museum's collection.

Notes and references

External links

Further reading
Kirby-Welch, David H; Morton Lee, Commander John. Thomas Bush Hardy RBA (1842–1897): A master painter of marine and coastal watercolours, Antique Collectors' Club, 2009, 245 pp.

1842 births
1897 deaths
Burials at Highgate Cemetery
19th-century English painters
Artists from Sheffield
British marine artists
English male painters
English watercolourists
Hague School
19th-century English male artists